Sanga, is an urban center in the Kiruhura District, Ankole sub-region, in the Western Region of Uganda.

Location
The  geographical coordinates of Sanga, Uganda are 0°29'54.0"S, 30°54'27.0"E (Latitude:-0.498333; Longitude:30.907500).

Overview
Sanga is immediately outside the northern borders of Lake Mburo National Park. Because of its location on a major highway (Masaka-Mbarara Road), it has developed into a stop-over for buses travelling between Kampala and Masaka to the east and north and Mbarara, Ntungamo, Rukungiri, Kabale, Kisoro, and Kigali to the west and south. Some of the items for sale include fresh milk, roasted meat, cheese, ghee, and charcoal. One of the two main gates into Lake Mburo National Park is located at Sanga.

Population
The Uganda Bureau of Statistics (UBOS) projected the population of Sanga Municipality at 5,200 in 2012. In 2019, the town's population was estimated at about 10,000 people, with a sizable proportion from neighboring Burundi, Democratic Republic of the Congo and Rwanda.

In 2015, UBOS estimated the mid-year population of Sanga, Uganda at 9,300 people. In 2020, the statistics agency estimated the mid-year population of the town at 11,200, of whom 5,800 (51.8 percent) were males and 5,400 (48.2 percent) were females. UBOS calculated that the town's population grew at an average annual rate of 3.79 percent, between 2015 and 2020.

See also
Dairy industry in Uganda
List of cities and towns in Uganda
Kiruhura, Uganda
Kazo, Uganda
Rushere, Uganda

References

External links
Website of Kiruhura District Administration

Kiruhura District
Ankole sub-region
Populated places in Western Region, Uganda